This is a list of New Zealand television events and premieres which occurred, or are scheduled to occur, in 2008, the 48th year of continuous operation of television in New Zealand.

Events
15 April - The former Silver Fern Temepara George and her partner Stefano Olivieri win the fourth series of Dancing with the Stars.
22 April - Debut of Stars in Their Eyes, a series hosted by Simon Barnett in which members of the public impersonate their favourite singers.
24 June - The first series of Stars in Their Eyes is won by Deryn Trainer performing as Billy Joel.
29 October - 16-year-old dancer Chaz Cummings wins the first series of New Zealand's Got Talent

Premieres

Domestic
22 April - Stars in Their Eyes (TV One) (2008-2009)
2 July - Burying Brian (TV One) (2008)
8 September - New Zealand's Got Talent (Prime) (2008-2013)

International
19 June -  Army Wives (TV2)
21 October -  Lipstick Jungle (TV3)
 Tom and Jerry Tales (TV2)
 Roary the Racing Car (TV2)
 Squirrel Boy (TV2)
/ Transformers: Animated (TV2)

Television shows

2000s
Dancing with the Stars (2005-2009)

Ending This Year

Births

Deaths